Udalmella is a monotypic genus of Panamanian jumping spiders containing the single species, Udalmella gamboa. It was first described by María Elena Galiano in 1994, and is found in Panama.

References

Monotypic Salticidae genera
Salticidae
Spiders of Central America